Helena Łazarska (15 August 1934 – 28 October 2022) was a Polish operatic (lyric and Coloratura soprano) and vocal pedagogue.

References 

1934 births
2022 deaths
Polish operatic sopranos
Voice teachers
Alumni of the Academy of Music in Kraków
Academic staff of the Academy of Music in Kraków
Recipients of the Gold Medal for Merit to Culture – Gloria Artis
People from Poznań